Zoë Mode was a subsidiary studio of Kuju Entertainment based in Brighton, England. Zoë Mode's games portfolio covered a variety of genres and comprised big-brand entertainment, original social games and innovative gameplay use of motion capture technologies such as the PlayStation EyeToy and Xbox 360 Kinect. They developed EyeToy: Play, SingStar, Disney Sing It and Zumba franchises in music and party games. Zoë Mode was also known for creating Crush, Chime and Haunt.

History 

In 2003, Kuju Entertainment hired the Wide Games team to create the video games studio Kuju Brighton. In 2007, Kuju Brighton was rebranded to Zoë Mode. The studio's first release under its new name was Crush for Sega. In 2009, Zoe Mode released the puzzle game Chime, produced by the non-profit OneBigGame. In 2011, the studio signed the deal to develop Zumba Fitness 2. In June 2013, Zoe Mode signed the deal to develop Rock Revolution.

Games 
 EyeToy: Play 3 (2005)
 SingStar Rocks! (2006)
 EyeToy Play Sports (2006)
 SingStar Pop Hits (2007)
 Crush (2007)
 Dancing with the Stars (2007)
 EyeCreate (2007)
 EyeToy: Play Astro Zoo (2007)
 Disney Sing It! (2008)
 EyeToy Play: Hero (2008)
 Rock Revolution (2008-2009)
 You're in the Movies (2008-2009)
 Marvel Ultimate Alliance (2016 port of 2006)
 Marvel Ultimate Alliance 2 (2016 port of 2009)
 Chime (2010)
 Grease: The Game (2010)
 Grease Dance (2011)
 Zumba Fitness 2 (2011-2012)
 Haunt (2012)
 Crush 3D (2012)
 Zumba Fitness Rush (2012)
 Zumba Fitness Core (2012)
 Zumba Fitness: World Party (2013)
 Zumba Kids (2013)
 Powerstar Golf (2013)
 Risk (2014)
 Guitar Hero Live (2015)
 Risk Urban Assault (2016)

See also 
 Kuju Entertainment
 Headstrong Games

References

External links 
Official website

British companies established in 2004
Defunct video game companies of the United Kingdom
Video game development companies
Video game companies established in 2004
Motion capture
Companies based in Brighton
2004 establishments in England